Bistrica is a village in the municipality of Čaška, North Macedonia. It used to be part of the former municipality of Bogomila.

Demographics
The settlement last had inhabitants in the 1971 census, where it was recorded as being populated by 8 Albanians, 1 Macedonian and 1 "Other".

According to the 2002 census, the village had 0 inhabitants.

References

Villages in Čaška Municipality
Albanian communities in North Macedonia